Leslie and the Badgers or Leslie Stevens and The Badgers is a Los Angeles-based folk-country band that was formed in 2006 by the songwriter and vocalist Leslie Stevens, formerly of the female fronted punk band Zeitgeist Auto Parts.  The Badgers released their first album, Leslie and the Badgers, in 2007. It is currently out of print. Five songs from the album became the EP Greetings from.... in 2008. The band's 2009 release, Roomful of Smoke, was produced by David Bianco (Bob Dylan, Tom Petty, Tift Merritt). The Los Angeles Times said Stevens' voice and writing evokes Patsy Cline while No Depression wrote that she calls to mind Emmylou Harris.

The band has toured extensively on the West Coast and was invited to showcase at SXSW in 2010 and to perform on National Public Radio's Mountain Stage show. They have toured with Rhett Miller and Laura Veirs among others, and opened for Loudon Wainwright III. The band has appeared at Noise Pop, The Eagle Rock Music Festival and Topanga Days. Their first national tour in May 2010 took them east for the first time to Chicago and New York City. 

The band made its first TV appearance in April 2008 playing their original "Old Timers" on the FX series, The Riches, starring Minnie Driver.

Discography
 Leslie and the Badgers (2007) (out of print)
 Greetings from.....(EP) (2008) LyricLand 
 Roomful of Smoke (2010) LyricLand Thirty Tigers
 Los Angeles (7" vinyl) (2010) Trailer Fire Records
 LESLIE STEVENS
 The Donkey and The Rose" (2016)  Leslie Stevens Solo
 Sinner'' (2019) Leslie Stevens, Solo Thirty Tigers

References

External links
 Official website
 MySpace.com site
 Facebook site

Musical groups from Los Angeles
American country rock groups
American alternative country groups
Folk rock groups from California
Musical groups established in 2006
Red Rockets Glare artists